Anass Achahbar (born 13 January 1994) is a Dutch professional footballer who plays as a midfielder for Liga I side Sepsi OSK.

Career

Feyenoord
Born in The Hague, Achahbar made his professional debut for Feyenoord on 28 August 2011, as he replaced Kelvin Leerdam in the 81st minute of the Eredivisie home match against Heerenveen (2–2).

Achahbar scored his first goal for Feyenoord in the 93rd minute of the first leg of the UEFA Europa League qualifier against Sparta Prague in De Kuip, an important equalizer that meant that Feyenoord came away with a 2–2 draw.

Arminia Bielefeld (loan)
On 22 August 2013, Achahbar was sent on loan at Arminia Bielefeld until the end of the season. He made 11 appearances in the 2. Bundesliga for the club, and also played in the Oberliga Westfalen for the second team. After his loan, he returned to Feyenoord for the 2014–15 season.

PEC Zwolle
On 21 May 2016, Achahbar signed a four-year contract with Eredivisie side PEC Zwolle. In his first season at the club, he made 20 total appearances in which he scored one goal.

NEC (loan)
On 28 June 2017, Achahar joined second-tier Eerste Divisie club NEC on loan. He made his debut on 8 September 2017 in the 3–0 loss to Den Bosch. He came on for Janio Bikel after 65 minutes. He suffered a number of injuries during his first period at the club. He had five stitches placed in his foot, broke a finger and had an injury to his shoulder. On 24 November, he made his return against Jong Ajax. On 27 November, he scored his first goal of the season against Telstar. On 22 December, he scored the first hat-trick of his career against Jong AZ (7–2 victory). In the following game against Go Ahead Eagles (5–1 win), he scored another hat-trick. Achahbar was loaned out to NEC for a second season in the 2018–19 season. In January 2019, after an argument with trainer Jack de Gier during the away match against Eindhoven, he was demoted to the second team together with Brahim Darri and did not return to the first team after that.

In the summer of 2019 Achahbar would return to PEC Zwolle, but eventually PEC Zwolle and Achahbar decided to terminate the ongoing contract.

Dordrecht
After practicing with Dordrecht for three weeks, he joined the club on 9 September for the 2019–20 season. After four months, in which he made 16 appearances, he left the club.

Sepsi OSK
On 18 January 2020, Achahbar signed a contract with Liga I side Sepsi OSK. He was part of the team losing the 2019–20 Cupa României to FCSB. In the semi-finals, Achahbar had contributed with two goals as Sepsi won 5–1 over Politehnica Iași to advance to the final.

Career statistics

Honours

Club
Feyenoord
KNVB Cup: 2015–16

Sepsi OSK 
Cupa României: 2021–22
Supercupa României: 2022

Netherlands U17
 UEFA European Under-17 Football Championship: 2011

Individual
2011 UEFA European Under-17 Championship Team of the Tournament
2013 UEFA European Under-19 Championship Golden Boot: 2013

References

External links
 
 Netherlands U17 stats at OnsOranje
 Netherlands U19 stats at OnsOranje

1994 births
Living people
Footballers from The Hague
Dutch sportspeople of Moroccan descent
Association football forwards
Dutch footballers
Dutch expatriate footballers
Eredivisie players
Eerste Divisie players
2. Bundesliga players
Oberliga (football) players
Liga I players
Feyenoord players
PEC Zwolle players
NEC Nijmegen players
Arminia Bielefeld players
FC Dordrecht players
Sepsi OSK Sfântu Gheorghe players
Netherlands youth international footballers
Expatriate footballers in Germany
Expatriate footballers in Romania
Dutch expatriate sportspeople in Germany
Dutch expatriate sportspeople in Romania
Haaglandia players